Danger on the Air is a 1938 American mystery film directed by Otis Garrett.  The film was based on the novel Death Catches Up with Mr. Kluck by author Xanthippe.

Plot summary
Nan Grey, as Christina "Steenie" MacCorkle, a radio advertising executive, is suspected of murdering her client as Caesar Kluck, a soda magnate.

Loathed by all who met him, or forced to work, with his underhanded business machinations, the victims, and suspects, start piling up. Including thug, Joe Downing, as Gangster Joe Carney; Lee J. Cobb as Tony Lisotti, trying to protect his daughter, Louise Stanley, as Maria Lisotti, from being another notch on Kluck's belt; and, Peter Lind Hayes, as Harry Lake, who is desperate to get on the air, seemingly at any cost.

Cast

Production
Danger on the Air was based on The Crime Club novel Death Catches Up with Mr. Kluck by Xantippe. Production on the film began in mid May 1938.

Release
Danger on the Air was released on July 1, 1938 by Universal Studios.

Reception
From retrospective reviews, the authors of Universal Horrors declared the film to be "One of the better Crime Club entries" noting that "Nan Grey contributes a particularly ingratiating performance."

References

Footnotes

Sources

External links

1938 films
1938 mystery films
American black-and-white films
Films based on American novels
Films based on mystery novels
American mystery films
Films directed by Otis Garrett
Universal Pictures films
1930s English-language films
1930s American films